Madisonville Airport may refer to:

 Madisonville Municipal Airport (Kentucky) in Madisonville, Kentucky, United States
 Madisonville Municipal Airport (Texas) in Madisonville, Texas, United States
 Monroe County Airport (Tennessee) in Madisonville, Tennessee, United States